Gurudas Banerjee, also known as Gurudas Bandyopadhyay, is a Bengali stage and film actor who was active from the 1940s through the 1980s. As an actor, he commonly played holy men, especially the 19th century Bengali mystic Sri Ramakrishna, a role he was said to "almost monopolize." He acted in more than 80 films, mostly in Bengali. With his wife, actress Molina Devi, he also directed a Calcutta-based theatre troupe, M. G. Enterprises.

Biography

Gurudas Banerjee had his stage debut in 1948 at Calcutta's Kalika Theatre in the role of Sri Ramakrishna in Yugadevata. He continued acting in theatre and cinema until the 1980s.
Banerjee married Molina Devi (1917-1977), who has been characterized as "one of the finest actresses of Indian theatre and cinema." Together, they operated their own touring theatre, M. G. Enterprises, which "specialized in commercial productions of devotional drama"
in which Banerjee played the role of Sri Ramakrishna and other holy men.

Roles
Gurudas Banerjee acted in a variety of roles, very commonly as Sri Ramakrishna, which he played on both stage and in film.
Other roles that Banerjee played in film included
Sadhak Bamakhyapa (Sadhak Bamakshyapa, 1958; Joy Maa Tara, 1978),
Gobinda, Husband Of Chandi (Swayamsiddha, 1947),
Ramola's Father (Sare Chuattar, 1953),
Jitu, Anita's Father (Ekti Raat, 1956),
Pishemashai (Indranath, Srikanta O Annadadidi, 1959),
Neepa's Father (Mouchak, 1975), and
Agniswar's Father-in-law (Agniswar, 1975).

From the 1950s through the 1970s, Gurudas Banerjee commonly portrayed Ramakrishna in the Bengali Theatre and films. Beginning in the late 1940s, "he almost monopolized this role [of Ramakrishna] as a specialist, both on the stage and on the screen,"<ref
   name=calcutheaters></ref> and was still portraying Ramakrishna in the late-1970s. Sushil Mukherjee explains that the drama Jugadevata, which debuted on the Calcutta stage on 19 November 1948,

Films in which Banerjee played the role of Ramakrishna included Vidyasagar(1950),Rani Rashmoni (1955), Mahakavi Girish Chandra (1956), Bireswar Vivekananda (1964), and Jata Mat Tata Path (1979).
Theatrical plays in which Banerjee played Ramakrishna included Jugadebata (1948), Thakur Sri Ramakrishna (1955), and Nata Nati (1975).
In fact he was the only actor to play roles of all the prominent Shaakto (Devotee of Goddess Shakti) mystics of the 18th and 19th Century Bengal, namely Sadhak Ramprasad, Kamalakanta Bhattacharya, Shri Ramakrishna Paramhamsa and Sadhak Bamakhyapa.

Reception
According to Sushil Mukherjee, in the many screen and stage appearances since 1948 in which Banerjee and Molina Devi have played Ramakrishna and Rani Rashmoni together, they "have carried the audience with them in every performance."

In 1966, The Illustrated Weekly of India mentioned Banerjee's troupe's performance in a review of the 1965-66 theatre season in Delhi.
The Weekly stated that

Filmography

Gurudas Banerjee acted in more than 80 films, mostly in Bengali, as listed here (including year released, and role if available; all films in Bengali unless otherwise noted):
Banglar Meye (1941) 
Swayamsiddha (1947) (Gobinda, Husband Of Chandi)
Kalo Chhaya (1948)
Ultorath (1949)
Paribartan (1949)
Mayajaal (1949)
Kuasha (1949)
Cartoon (1949)
Vidyasagar (1950)
Sree Tulsidas (1950)
Sanchali (1950)
Sahodar (1950)
Kankantala Light Railway (1950)
Jugadebata (1950)
Gypsy Meye (1950)
Apabad (1950)
Ganyer Meye (1951)
Bhakta Raghunath (1951)
Bhairab Mantra (1951)
Anandamath (1951)
Vidyasagar (1952, Hindi)
Sabitri Satyaban (1952)
Nildarpan (1952)
Mahishasur Badh (1952)
Sanjibani (1952)
Sarala (1953)
Rami Chandidas (1953)
Maharaja Nandakumar (1953)
Bhagaban Srikrishna Chaitanya (1953) 
Sare Chuattar (1953) (Ramola's Father)
Makarsar Jaal (1953) 
Shibashakti (1954)
Sada Kalo (1954)
Naa (1954)
Rani Rasmani (film) (1955) (Sri Ramakrishna)
Katha Kao (1955)
Joy Maa Kali Boarding (1955)
Chatujye Banrujye (1955)
Atmadarshan (1955)
Aparadhi (1955)
Sajher Pradip (1955)
Debatra (1955)
Subholagna (1956)
Sadhak Ramprasad (1956)
Rajpath (1956)
Mahakabi Girishchandra (1956) (Sri Ramakrishna)
Bhola Master (1956)
Asamapta (1956)
Abhagir Swarga (1956)
Ekti Raat (1956) (Jitu, Anita's Father)
Tamasa (1957)
Nilachale Mahaprabhu (1957)
Ami Baro Habo (1957)
Sree Sree Maa (1958)
Sadhak Bamakshyapa (1958) (Sadhak Bamakhyapa)
Purir Mandir (1958)
Mejo Jamai (1958)
Kangsa (1958)
Jonakir Alo (1958)
Indranath Srikanta O Annadadidi (1959) (Pishemashai)
Abhishap (1959)
Tailangaswami (1960)
Nader Nimai (1960)
Kono Ek Din (1960)
Sadhak Kamalakanta (1961)
Carey Saheber Munsi (1961)
Taranisen Badh (1962)
Bireswar Viveknanda (1964) (Sri Ramakrishna)
Rup Sanatan (1965)
Bharater Sadhak (1965)
Debitirtha Kamrup Kamakshya (1967)
Adyashakti Mahamayay (1968)
Trinayani Maa (1971)
Umno O Jhumno (1975)
Swayamsiddha (1975)
Mouchak (1975) (Neepa's Father)
Agniswar (1975) (Agniswar's Father-in-law) 
Nagar Darpane (1975)
Sree Sree Maa Lakshmi (1977)
Baba Taraknath (1977)
Jaal Sanyasi (1977)
Joy Maa Tara (1978) (Sadhak Bamakhyapa)
Balak Saratchandra (1978)
Aguner Phulki (1978)
Jato Mat Tato Path (1979) (Sri Ramakrishna)
Dub De Mon Kali Bole (1979)
Matribhakta Ramprasad (1980)
Abhi (1980)
Maa Bhabani Maa Amar (1982)
Kshyapa Thakur (1987) (Mohanto baba)
Bile Naren (1988)

Film table with references
Further details on selected films appear in the table below. Films known to be dubbed versions of other films have not been listed. Any films known to be multilinguals (separately filmed in multiple languages) are explicitly noted as multilinguals.

Theatre roles
The following table chronicles Gurudas Banerjee's stage career. It is not complete.

References

External links
Gurudas Banerjee at IMDB, Gomolo, CITWF
Photo of Gurudas Banerjee (Gomolo)

Male actors in Bengali cinema
People from Rajasthan
Indian male stage actors
Bengali theatre personalities
Indian male film actors
20th-century Indian male actors
Living people
Year of birth missing (living people)